Choreutidae, or metalmark moths, are a family of insects in the lepidopteran order whose relationships have been long disputed. It was placed previously in the superfamily Yponomeutoidea in family Glyphipterigidae and in superfamily Sesioidea. It is now considered to represent its own superfamily (Minet, 1986). The relationship of the family to the other lineages in the group "Apoditrysia" need a new assessment, especially with new molecular data.

Distribution
The moths occur worldwide, with 19 genera in three subfamilies defined by the structural characteristics of the immature stages (larvae and pupae), rather than the characters of the adults (Heppner and Duckworth, 1981; Rota, 2005).

Behaviour
These small moths often bear metallic scales and are mostly day-flying (some also come to lights), with a jerky, pivoting behaviour, and may fluff up their wings at an extreme angle. Some tropical exemplars such as the genus Saptha are quite spectacular, with bright green metallic bands. The members of the genus Brenthia, usually placed in their own subfamily Brenthiinae, have eyespots on the wings and have been shown to mimic jumping spiders (Rota and Wagner, 2006).

Larval hostplants
Most species skeletonize leaves often among silken webbing. The foodplants of many Choreutinae occurring in the temperate region and some tropical species are known  being dominated by Asteraceae, Betulaceae, Boraginaceae, Dipterocarpaceae, Fabaceae, Labiatae, Moraceae (mainly Ficus), Rosaceae, Sapindaceae and Urticaceae. The European nettle-tap moth (Anthophila fabriciana Linnaeus, 1767), is  a familiar sight pirouetting around "stinging nettles" Urtica and nearby flowers while  Choreutis pariana  skeletonizes apple leaves. The last genus has 85 species worldwide one of which, C. tigroides, is a pest of "jackfruit" (Artocarpus) (Dugdale et al., 1999).

Notes

References

Sources
 
Dugdale, J.S., Kristensen, N.P., Robinson, G.S. and Scoble, M.J. (1999) [1998]. The smaller microlepidoptera grade superfamilies, Ch.13., pp. 217–232 in Kristensen, N.P. (Ed.). Lepidoptera, Moths and Butterflies. Volume 1: Evolution, Systematics, and Biogeography. Handbuch der Zoologie. Eine Naturgeschichte der Stämme des Tierreiches / Handbook of Zoology. A Natural History of the phyla of the Animal Kingdom. Band / Volume IV Arthropoda: Insecta Teilband / Part 35: 491 pp. Walter de Gruyter, Berlin, New York.

External links
 
 
 
 
 
 
 
 

 
Moth families
Taxa named by Henry Tibbats Stainton